Mount Zion is an unincorporated community in Rochester Township, Fulton County, in the U.S. state of Indiana.

Geography

References

Unincorporated communities in Fulton County, Indiana
Unincorporated communities in Indiana